Circolo Sportivo Italiano is a Peruvian football club, playing in the department of Pueblo Libre, Lima.

History
The club have played at the highest level of Peruvian football on nine occasions, from 1926 Peruvian Primera División until 1934 Peruvian Primera División when was relegated.

Year-by-year

Notable players
 Tulio Quiñones
 Jorge Pardón García

Honours

National
Peruvian Primera División: 0
 Runner-up (1): 1929

Regional
Liga Distrital de San Isidro:
 Runner-up (3): 2013, 2015, 2022

Women’s volleyball
Liga Nacional Superior de Voleibol: 
Winners (2): 2003, 2008–09
 Runner-up (1): 2018–19

See also
List of football clubs in Peru
Peruvian football league system

References
 RSSSF

Football clubs in Peru